In mathematics and logic, a vacuous truth is a conditional or universal statement (a universal statement that can be converted to a conditional statement) that is true because the antecedent cannot be satisfied. For example, the statement "she does not own a cell phone" will imply that the statement "all of her cell phones are turned off" will be assigned a truth value. Additionally, the statement "all of her cell phones are turned on" would also be vacuously true, as would the conjunction of the two: "all of her cell phones are turned on and turned off", which would otherwise be incoherent and false. For that reason, it is sometimes said that a statement is vacuously true because it is meaningless.

More formally, a relatively well-defined usage refers to a conditional statement (or a universal conditional statement) with a false antecedent. One example of such a statement is "if Tokyo is in France, then the Eiffel Tower is in Bolivia".

Such statements are considered vacuous truths, because the fact that the antecedent is false prevents using the statement to infer anything about the truth value of the consequent. In essence, a conditional statement, that is based on the material conditional, is true when the antecedent ("Tokyo is in France" in the example) is false regardless of whether the conclusion or consequent ("the Eiffel Tower is in Bolivia" in the example) is true or false because the material conditional is defined in that way.

Examples common to everyday speech include conditional phrases used as idioms of improbability like "when hell freezes over..." and "when pigs can fly...", indicating that not before the given (impossible) condition is met will the speaker accept some respective (typically false or absurd) proposition.

In pure mathematics, vacuously true statements are not generally of interest by themselves, but they frequently arise as the base case of proofs by mathematical induction. This notion has relevance in pure mathematics, as well as in any other field that uses classical logic.

Outside of mathematics, statements which can be characterized informally as vacuously true can be misleading. Such statements make reasonable assertions about qualified objects which do not actually exist. For example, a child might truthfully tell their parent "I ate every vegetable on my plate", when there were no vegetables on the child's plate to begin with. In this case, the parent can believe that the child has actually eaten some vegetables, even though that is not true. In addition, a vacuous truth is often used colloquially with absurd statements, either to confidently assert something (e.g. "the dog was red, or I'm a monkey's uncle" to strongly claim that the dog was red), or to express doubt, sarcasm, disbelief, incredulity or indignation (e.g. "yes, and I'm the King of England" to disagree a previously made statement).

Scope of the concept 

A statement  is "vacuously true" if it resembles a material conditional statement , where the antecedent  is known to be false.

Vacuously true statements that can be reduced (with suitable transformations) to this basic form (material conditional) include the following universally quantified statements:
 , where it is the case that .
 , where the set  is empty.
This logical form  can be converted to the material conditional form in order to easily identify the antecedent. This can be written to a material conditional statement  where  is the set of all things in the room (including cell phones if they exist in the room), the antecedent  is " is a cell phone", and the consequent  is " is turned off".
 , where the symbol  is restricted to a type that has no representatives.

Vacuous truths most commonly appear in classical logic with two truth values. However, vacuous truths can also appear in, for example, intuitionistic logic, in the same situations as given above. Indeed, if  is false, then  will yield a vacuous truth in any logic that uses the material conditional; if  is a necessary falsehood, then it will also yield a vacuous truth under the strict conditional.

Other non-classical logics, such as relevance logic, may attempt to avoid vacuous truths by using alternative conditionals (such as the case of the counterfactual conditional).

In computer programming 
Many programming environments have a mechanism for querying if every item in a collection of items satisfies some predicate.  It is common for such a query to always evaluate as true for an empty collection.  For example:

 In JavaScript, the array method every executes a provided callback function once for each element present in the array, only stopping (if and when) it finds an element where the callback function returns false. Notably, calling the every method on an empty array will return true for any condition.
 In Python, the all function returns True if all of the elements of the given iterable are True. The function also returns True when given an iterable of zero length.
 In Rust, the Iterator::all function accepts an iterator and a predicate and returns true only when the predicate returns true for all items produced by the iterator, or if the iterator produces no items.

Examples 

These examples, one from mathematics and one from natural language, illustrate the concept of vacuous truths:

 "For any integer x, if x > 5 then x > 3." – This statement is true non-vacuously (since some integers are indeed greater than 5), but some of its implications are only vacuously true: for example, when x is the integer 2, the statement implies the vacuous truth that "if 2 > 5 then 2 > 3".
 "All my children are goats" is a vacuous truth, when spoken by someone without children. Similarly, "None of my children are goats" would also be a vacuous truth, when spoken by someone without children (possibly the same person).

See also 
 De Morgan's laws – specifically the law that a universal statement is true just in case no counterexample exists: 
 Empty sum and empty product
 Empty function
 Paradoxes of material implication, especially the principle of explosion
 Presupposition, double question
 State of affairs (philosophy)
 Tautology (logic) – another type of true statement that also fails to convey any substantive information
 Triviality (mathematics) and degeneracy (mathematics)

References

Bibliography 
 Blackburn, Simon (1994). "vacuous," The Oxford Dictionary of Philosophy. Oxford: Oxford University Press, p. 388.
 David H. Sanford (1999). "implication." The Cambridge Dictionary of Philosophy, 2nd. ed., p. 420.

External links 
 Conditional Assertions: Vacuous truth

Logic
Mathematical logic
Truth
Informal fallacies